Manfred Gollner (born 22 December 1990) is an Austrian professional footballer who plays as a centre-back for Austrian Bundesliga club TSV Hartberg.

Club career
On 27 July 2020 he returned to TSV Hartberg.

References

External links
 
 

1990 births
Living people
Austrian footballers
Austrian Football Bundesliga players
Kapfenberger SV players
Wolfsberger AC players
TSV Hartberg players
Association football defenders
2. Liga (Austria) players
People from Judenburg
Footballers from Styria